Florian Carvalho de Fonseco (born 9 March 1989 in Fontainebleau) is a French middle distance runner.  He competed in the men's 1500 m at the 2012 and 2016 Olympics.

International competitions

References

1989 births
Living people
French male middle-distance runners
French people of Portuguese descent
Sportspeople from Fontainebleau
Athletes (track and field) at the 2012 Summer Olympics
Athletes (track and field) at the 2016 Summer Olympics
Olympic athletes of France
European Athletics Championships medalists